Ahja is a small borough in Põlva Parish, Põlva County in southeastern Estonia. Named after the Ahja River, it is located 191  km  southeast of Tallinn and about 16km north of Põlva.

Ahja manor
The earliest references to Ahja estate are from 1553. It belonged to the Oxenstierna family in the 17th century but was later taken over by the Swedish state through one of the so-called reductions.

In 1716, it was given to Christina Glück, the widow of Johann Ernst Glück, in whose family the future Catherine I of Russia grew up. The present two-storey, Baroque style building with a pavilion-shaped main entrance dates from the period of ownership of François Guillemot de Villebois, who was the son-in-law of Christina Glück. The building was completed around 1749, probably built by master builders from St. Petersburg.

In 1770, Jakob Michael Reinhold Lenz became for two years the manager of the estate. Later, it belonged to various Baltic German families. One of these was the von Brasch, who built a burial chapel, still standing, for their family members in the manor park.

See also
 List of palaces and manor houses in Estonia

Notable people
Signy Aarna (born 1990), football player
Andrus Murumets (born 1978), strongman
Friedebert Tuglas (1886–1971), writer

See also
List of palaces and manor houses in Estonia

References

External links
Ahja manor at Estonian Manors Portal

Boroughs and small boroughs in Estonia
Manor houses in Estonia
Kreis Dorpat